Maulana Sufi Abdul Hameed Khan Swati (1917 – 6 April 2008) (Urdu: مولانا صوفی عبد الحمید خان سواتی) was a Pakistani Islamic scholar, writer, Imam, lecturer and founder of Jamia Nusrat Ul Uloom Gujranwala. He was the younger brother of Muhammad Sarfaraz Khan Safdar and uncle of Zahid Khan.

Early life and education
Swati was born in 1917 to Noor Ahmad Khan in Cheeran Dhaki on the top of the hill of Kurmang Bala, a few miles from Shinkiari, Mansehra District. His mother died in his infancy. Sometime later, his father also passed away and he along with his brother Muhammad Sarfaraz Khan Safdar continued to study together at various madrassas in Buffa, Malikpur, Khakho, Lahore, Wadala Sindhwan, Jahanian Mandi, Gujranwala and other places and then reached Darul Uloom Deoband in 1941 where they benefited from the Hussain Ahmed Madani and others. Swati also studied at the Government Nizamia Tibbi College and Darul Muballigheen Lucknow with Abdul Shakoor Lakhnavi.

Career
After graduation he returned to Gujranwala where he performed religious services in some mosques of Khayali and Krishna Nagar (Faisalabad neighborhood) for some time and started a clinic in Chowk Niain. In 1952, on the advice of his teacher, Abdul Wahid, and other scholars, he began construction of a religious seminary Madrasa Nusratul Uloom and a mosque Jamia Masjid Noor. He had the patronage of Ahmad Ali Lahori, Abdullah Darkhawasti and Abdul Wahid and the companionship of his brother Muhammad Sarfaraz Khan Safdar.

Literary works
Swati wrote several books, Including;

 Maalim ul Irfan fi Daroos ul Quran
 Khutbat-i-Swati
 Maqalat-i-Swati
 Aun Al Khabir

Death and legacy 
On 5 April 2008 Swati died and was buried in Kalan Gujranwala Cemetery. He left behind three sons, his successor Haji Muhammad Fayyaz Khan Swati, Muhammad Riaz Khan Swati and Muhammad Arabaz Khan Swati.

References

1917 births
2008 deaths
Pakistani Islamic religious leaders
Darul Uloom Deoband alumni
People from Mansehra District
People from Gujranwala District
Pakistani Sunni Muslim scholars of Islam
Deobandis
Muslim missionaries
Pakistani religious writers
People from Swat District